Berle Brant (born 26 September 1989) is an Estonian footballer who plays as a defender for Saku Sporting and the Estonia women's national team.

Career
Brant has played for Pärnu JK in the UEFA Women's Champions League and has also represented Estonia at international level.

References

1989 births
Living people
Women's association football defenders
Estonian women's footballers
Estonia women's international footballers
Pärnu JK players
People from Põhja-Pärnumaa Parish